Homotropus is a genus of wasps in the family Ichneumonidae.

References 

Ichneumonidae genera
Diplazontinae